is a Japanese science-fiction anime television series that aired on TV Tokyo from April 1 to September 23, 2004. It is currently licensed by Bandai Entertainment.  is a simulation game based on the concept, developed and published by Sony Computer Entertainment for the PlayStation 2 video game console.

Plot
Life on Mars is hard for those who live here. As the economy worsens, work becomes scarce and food becomes expensive and highly prized. Gram and his friends try to do the best they can but, he finds himself on the run with the most notorious pirates on Mars. The only problem is he soon starts to enjoy the adventure.

Characters

Main characters
Gram River

The anime's main protagonist.

Vestemona "Vess" Lauren

Gram's childhood friend and eventual sweetheart, who was a fellow orphan on Adena Cityship.

Crew of the Ship of Aurora
Elizabeth Liati

The Captain of Aurora who oversees what's going on in the ship, and will not tolerate any betrayal.

Kato Takigawa Jr.

Nicknamed Junior or Shou, dreams of becoming an R.B diver, despite what anyone says otherwise.

MAKI

The AI of the Aurora who has a personality of her own.

Ester Ein Astrada

Like Elizabeth, she also pilots the Aurora. She also keeps track on the surrounding waters, whether it be the Earth Forces launching their attack or any other creatures. She is 141 years old. Ester often refers to herself as a Nautical Witch, who fought in a war a long time ago. It is possible she is a gynoid or some other kind of artificial being. In the Japanese anime, her voice actress is Fumiko Orikasa, and her voice actress is Kate Higgins in the English adaptation.

Yagami Arian

A soldier under Nelle Poe who fought for Mars independence during the Pan-Galactic War, where he was apparently part of a vast battle in which he was either the only survivor, or one of very few. He is nicked-named "The Reaper" because of the many RBs he has destroyed, and the coldly efficient way he operates; early in the series, he informs Elizabeth that "I just don't know how to hold back."

Aki Polandwood

As with Nelly, he also works as a mechanic in the Aurora, which they get the RBs ready for take off.

Megumi Higashibara

A girl who has the ability to read the minds, thoughts and emotions of various life forms.

Neli

As with Aki, she also takes care of the RB repairs and also prepares the RBs for launch.

Enora Taft

The granddaughter of Earth's president.

Sala

The nurse of the Aurora's clinic who tends to the wounded crew members.

Chrysalis Milch

The person in charge of loading the torpedoes and firing them at incoming enemies.

Clara

A cat that can talk. She is technically the "professor" of the Ship of Aurora, and is the most intelligent and logical of the crew.

Poipoider

A talking cetacean (resembles a small beluga whale) in a large water-filled suit, which enables him to walk on robotic legs and use robotic arms.

Other characters
Kubernes

An old acquaintance of Elizabeth.

Niall Poe

A self-proclaimed revolutionist who owns the Aurora.

Bon

A young orphan who takes care of his little sister, Shie.

Shie

Bon's little sister.

Selena Knightley

A woman from the Rodeo Sector where rich people live whose looking for her lover who apparently was a pirate.

Mars Aboriginies
The first colonists of Mars and only ones to experience Mars as a world not covered in water, the Aborigines were meant to be the first phase colonizers of Mars until the flood that would cover Mars in water.  After centuries had passed, Earth, believing that Mars was unpopulated soon allowed another group of colonists to populate Mars.  Instead, they found people surviving in such violent environment without advanced technology required to survive. The second migration occurred around 200 years before the time of the series.

Technology
Ship of Aurora
One of the most notorious pirate ships on Mars, where the mere mention of the name and/or just the sight of the Auroras' crewman puts fear in pirates and Earth Force service men alike.  Other pirates would run away from encounters with the Ship of Aurora.  In the series this is first shown during episode seven when the Black Whirlpool proclaimed that service shuttle form the Ship of Aurora is in the Whirlpool's personal berth.  The captain soon reverses his proclamation once he notice Milch, torpedo room officer in also being a formidable crewman of the Aurora, leaves the berth to the shuttle. Just like any pirate ship, the Ship of Aurora is crewed by many different species from a cat to a Naval Witch. The ships AI, MAKI, is also considered a crewman with its own personality. The submarine is armed with torpedoes, cannons, missiles, grappling hooks and several Round Bucklers. Its two most infamous attacks is the Daybreak, (which basically a ramming technique), and the Elizabeth Cannon, (which is just the Captain screaming at the top of her lungs), causing all those in the immediate vicinity to flee in absolute terror.

City-Ships
City-Ships are literally floating cities that drift in Mars huge ocean. The city ships have been around since Mars was colonized for a second time and some are over a hundred years old.

Round Bucklers
These are mecha designed solely for an underwater environment.  RBs can come in two different build designs, but all RBs are unique since they are completely based on the equipment used in the construction process.  The size of an RB varies form as roughly larger than basic pressure suit to a small iceberg. Throughout the series other mecha units are shown and used but are given no name and used in a variety of Jobs.

Cordless
A "Cordless" Round Buckler means that the pilot himself is contained within the unit itself, this most commonly used by pirates since the Earth Forces view Cordless designs as archaic. Throughout the series there are only five Cordless Round Bucklers.  Some details of how an RB is built is shown when the captain of The Ship of Aurora orders a crew member's RB sim pod to be scrapped and then be used in the construction of another Round Buckler.

Corded
Round Bucklers controlled externally (known as "corded") come in pairs, usually commanded by most simply a pressure suit to a Seahorse, a control unit used by the Earth forces.  Cables are attached to the RBs which are usually smaller, faster, capable of extreme maneuvers since there is no actual pilot within the RB itself compared to cordless; yet through the series whenever cordless and cord RBs are in combat a cordless RB is victorious, this may merely be because of the relative skill of most cordless pilots.  Though technically attached to control unit most cables have a beacon at the end of the cable that allows the RBs to move beyond the cables maximum length, usually several nautical miles further before the pilot is unable to control the RB.

Anime
The series was produced by Bones, directed by Kunihiro Mori with Miya Asakawa writing the script. Kaoru Wada composed the series' music and character designs by Hiroshi Osaka. It aired from April 1, to September 23, 2004 on TV Tokyo. The opening theme is "Take Back" by G B Shelter while the ending theme is "Aoi Tabibito (Blue Travelers)" by Takatsugu Tsumabuki.

References

External links
 Kenran Butousai Official Anime Site  (Japanese)
 TV Tokyo's Daybreak Website (Japanese)
 

2004 anime television series debuts
2005 video games
Anime with original screenplays
Bandai Entertainment anime titles
Bones (studio)
Mars in television
Mecha anime and manga
Television series about pirates
PlayStation 2-only games
TV Tokyo original programming
PlayStation 2 games
Video games developed in Japan